The 2018 FAO League was the ninth season of the FAO League. Radha Raman Club are the defending champions. Chauliaganj FC have entered as the promoted team from the FAO 2nd Division League. The FAO League is organised every year by the Football Association of Odisha (FAO), the official football governing body of Odisha, India. The regular season started on 17 August 2018.

Teams

Teams in Diamond League

Bidanasi Club
East Coast Railway
Jay Durga Club
Odisha Police
Radha Raman Club
Rising Student's Club
Sports Hostel
Sunrise Club

Teams in Gold League

Independent Club
Kishore Club
Mangala Club
Radha Gobind Club
Rising Star Club
Rovers Club
Young Utkal Club

Teams in Silver League

Azad Hind Club
Chand Club
Chauliaganj Club
Club N Club
Lalbag Club
Odisha Government Press (OGP)
SAI-STC
State Bank of India
Sunshine Club
Town Club
Western Mahaveer Club
Yuba Vandhu Cultural Group (YVCG)

Officiating

Match Officials
Sujit Kumar Patro

Referees

Arun Nayak
Bhim Kumar Chettri
Daitari Karua
Jamal Mohamed
Jyoti Ranjan Swain
Nabin Kumar Naik
R. Palmson Moses
Raju Mohanty
Sapneswar Kanhar
Sheikh Hayat
Sujit Kumar
Sudip Das
Suresh Dash
Tarun Kumar Pradhan

Revamp

League Format
In a total revamp of the league, the FAO League was converted from premier league of the state to second highest level footballing league in the year 2018 as the premier state level football league was introduced by the Football Association of Odisha. The league system currently is a three-tier system consisting of Diamond, Gold and Silver leagues. The top four teams of the diamond league and the winners of Gold and Silver league would be promoted to the FAO Super Cup i.e. highest state level football league in Odisha.

Venue

League stage

Diamond League

League table

Results

Gold League

Silver League

Group stage

Group A

Group B

Statistics

Scoring

Hat-tricks

References

FAO League
Sports competitions in Odisha
Ind
1